Amaury Nolasco Garrido (born December 24, 1970) is a Puerto Rican actor and producer, best known for the role of Fernando Sucre on the Fox television series Prison Break, and for his role in Transformers.

Early life
Nolasco was born in Puerto Rico to Dominican parents. After various acting gigs, Nolasco moved to New York City.

Career
Nolasco has guest-starred in various television series such as Arli$$, CSI: Crime Scene Investigation, and ER. His first role on a feature film was in Takeshi Kitano's Brother, along others as "Orange Julius" in Universal's 2 Fast 2 Furious. He then went on to co-star opposite Bernie Mac in Mr. 3000.

Nolasco's additional television and film credits include roles on George Lopez and CSI: NY, and in The Benchwarmers. He also appeared on Mind of Mencia as a guest on Sunday, April 29, 2007. He also starred in Director Michael Bay's Transformers, released during the summer of 2007. Bay offered to cast Nolasco in the sequel Transformers: Revenge of the Fallen, but he declined due to scheduling conflicts. His most high-profile role was Prison Break.

In November 2009, Nolasco made an appearance in Wisin & Yandel's music video "Imagínate" featuring T-Pain alongside Wilmer Valderrama.  He plays a jealous mobster who murders Valderrama's character for sleeping with his girlfriend. He also appears in Calle 13's music video "La Perla".

In March 2010, Nolasco guest-starred in three episodes during the second season of Southland, as Detective Rene Cordero.

From September 2010 to May 2011, he costarred in the NBC show Chase, a one-season show about U.S. Marshals that hunt down fugitives. He starred in the short-lived ABC television series Work It which premiered on January 3, 2012.

Nolasco was featured in the sitcom Telenovela, as Rodrigo Suarez, Ana Sofia's eccentric co-star who plays the show's villain.

Personal life
Nolasco began dating Jennifer Morrison in 2009, and the relationship reportedly lasted three years. 

He was a supporter of the presidential campaign of Barack Obama. 

For the second year in a row, Nolasco was the host of the Amaury Nolasco & Friends Golf Classic that took place in El Conquistador Hotel in Fajardo, Puerto Rico from June 10–11, 2011.  The  Amaury Nolasco & Friends Golf Classic is a celebrity golf tournament, where all the profits go to non-profit Puerto Rican organizations.  For the second season, the profits went to the University of Puerto Rico Pediatric Hospital and to the VAL Foundation (Vive Alegre Luchando), an organization that gives their funding to pediatric cancer patients.

Filmography

Film

Television

Awards
Nolasco has been nominated three times for an ALMA Award, and once for a Teen Choice Award.

See also
 List of Puerto Ricans

References

External links

 
 Biodata
 Prison Break website entry for Nolasco

1970 births
Living people
American male film actors
American male television actors
People from Vieques, Puerto Rico
Puerto Rican male actors
American people of Dominican Republic descent
Puerto Rican people of Dominican Republic descent